Bea Evenson Fountain is an outdoor fountain in San Diego's Balboa Park, in the U.S. state of California.

Designed by noted modernist architect Homer Delawie, the fountain honors Bea Evenson (1900–1981), the founding president of the park's Committee of 100, organized in the late 1960s to save or reconstruct the buildings of the Panama–California Exposition of 1915.

Built in 1972 on the Plaza de Balboa, the fountain was dedicated to Evenson in May 1981.

References

External links

 

1972 establishments in California
Balboa Park (San Diego)
Buildings and structures in San Diego
Fountains in California
Monuments and memorials to women